Bölükyayla is a town (belde) and municipality in the Kâhta District, Adıyaman Province, Turkey. The town is populated by Kurds of the Îzol tribe and had a population of 2,141 in 2021.

References

Towns in Turkey
Populated places in Adıyaman Province
Kâhta District
Kurdish settlements in Adıyaman Province